Noah Bartlett Cloud (January 26, 1809 – November 5, 1875) was an American educator, surgeon, and politician. He served as Alabama's "Superintendent of Public Instruction", the superintendent of public schools after the American Civil War; and served as a state representative for Montgomery County, Alabama, in 1873 in the Alabama House of Representatives. As Alabama School Superintendent he sought to establish a public school system in Alabama for both white and black students. He was labeled a "scalawag" by Southerners.

Biography 

Noah B. Cloud was born on January 26, 1809, in Edgefield District (now Edgefield County), South Carolina. He graduated from Jefferson Medical College in Pennsylvania in 1835. He was a member of the Whig Party, the Union Party, and then a Republican. He moved to Macon County, Alabama in 1838.

Cloud served as a surgeon in the Confederate States Army during the American Civil War (1861–1865). After the war he was appointed the first to be Alabama's "Superintendent of Public Instruction" (now Alabama State Superintendent of Education) for the Alabama State Department of Education. On September 1, 1868, Cloud and University of Alabama's president Arad Simon Lakin were the subject's of a Klan cartoon published in the Tuscaloosa Independent Monitor (see image). The cartoon featured images of the two educators lynched and hanging from a tree in the "City of Oaks" (or Tuscaloosa), with a KKK-labeled donkey below them, walking away.

He edited the Cotton Planter magazine (later known as The American Cotton Planter and Soil of the South). He married Mary M. Barton. He had a farm on Uchee Creek in Russell County, Alabama.

Some of his correspondence as superintendent of education are extant.

References

1809 births
1875 deaths
Confederate States Army surgeons
Republican Party members of the Alabama House of Representatives
Whig Party (United States) politicians
Union Party (United States) politicians
Jefferson Medical College alumni
People from Russell County, Alabama